Radix linae is a species of freshwater snail, a gastropod mollusk in the family Lymnaeidae.

Distribution 
 The Balearic Islands

References

Lymnaeidae
Gastropods described in 2007
Endemic fauna of the Balearic Islands